Terrell Anthony Cox, known professionally as Cochise (formerly known as Yung Cochise), is an American rapper, singer, and songwriter. His song "Tell Em" with fellow rapper Snot peaked at number 64 on the Billboard Hot 100 in 2021. Cochise's debut studio album, Benbow Crescent, was released in 2021.

Early life
Cox was born in Palm Beach, Florida, and grew up in Palm Bay, Florida. Being of Jamaican descent, he began to listen to reggae and dancehall music when he was young. As a kid, he was influenced by Richard Simmons. He also went to Heritage High School where he played soccer. He states the Island Boys are his idols and strives to be like them.

Career

2018–2019: Pulp and Hijack
On May 3, 2018, Cochise self-released his debut mixtape Pulp, with production from Hella Sketchy, Lousho, VashVash.

On August 23, 2019, he released his collab EP "Hijack" with Lousho.

2020–present: Hatchback, Benbow Crescent, and The Inspection
Following the success of his singles "Red Head" and "Hatchback", Cochise signed to Columbia Records after being introduced by his manager, Solmon. On May 7, 2021, Cochise released Benbow Crescent, his debut studio album. This album was an homage to Cox's Jamaican roots and included 18 featureless songs. Production was handled by Archie Cardella, ProdLouis, ProdbyCarlos, Lousho, and Cox himself.

On May 28, 2021, he later released his song "Tell Em" with rapper $not which peaked at number 64 on Billboard Hot 100 and became both rappers' first song to hit the charts. The duo went on to release a music video for "Tell Em" with Lyrical Lemonade.

Since his debut project, there have been comparisons between Cox and fellow rapper Playboi Carti, since they both have a distinguished "baby voice", which Carti resembled in 2018. 

On June 14, 2022, It was revealed that Cox was a part of XXLs "2022 Freshman Class".

On June 24, 2022, Cox released his second album The Inspection, which included features from Young Nudy and Chief Keef.

Discography

Albums

Mixtapes

Extended plays

Singles

References

Living people
Rappers from Florida
Singer-songwriters from Florida
American hip hop singers
21st-century American male singers
21st-century American rappers
American rappers of Jamaican descent
Year of birth missing (living people)
Trap musicians
Dancehall singers
Columbia Records artists